Kosonen is a Finnish surname. Notable people with the surname include:

 Eetu Kosonen (died 1953), Finnish gymnast
 Hanna Kosonen (born 1976), Finnish skier and politician
 Krista Kosonen (born 1983), Finnish actress
 Silja Kosonen (born 2002), Finnish hammer thrower
 Veikko Kosonen (1900–1971), Finnish politician
 Vihtori Kosonen (1873–1934), Finnish journalist

See also
 Mikko (restaurant)

Finnish-language surnames